Óscar Cortés may refer to:

 Óscar Cortés (footballer, born 1968 or 1970), Colombian footballer
 Óscar Cortés (footballer, born 2003), Colombian footballer